Johnson Jay Hayes (January 23, 1886 – October 22, 1970) was a United States district judge of the United States District Court for the Middle District of North Carolina.

Education and career

Born in Purlear, North Carolina, Hayes received a Bachelor of Laws from Wake Forest University School of Law in 1909. He was in private practice in Wilkesboro, North Carolina from 1909 to 1915.He was prosecuting attorney of the 17th North Carolina Judicial District from 1915 to 1926. He was in private practice in Greensboro, North Carolina in 1927.

Federal judicial service

Hayes received a recess appointment from President Calvin Coolidge on April 6, 1927, to the United States District Court for the Middle District of North Carolina, to a new seat authorized by 44 Stat. 1339. He was nominated to the same position by President Coolidge on December 6, 1927. He was confirmed by the United States Senate on January 9, 1928, and received his commission the same day. He assumed senior status on June 18, 1957. His service terminated on October 22, 1970, due to his death.

References

Sources
 

1886 births
1970 deaths
Wake Forest University School of Law alumni
Judges of the United States District Court for the Middle District of North Carolina
United States district court judges appointed by Calvin Coolidge
20th-century American judges